Holopneustes  is a genus of sea urchin, belonging to the family Temnopleuridae.

Species

See also
 Amblypneustes – a closely related genus

References

Temnopleuridae
Taxa named by Louis Agassiz